Wilhelm August Rieder (October 30, 1796 – September 8, 1880), was an Austrian painter and draughtsman.

Rieder was born in Oberdöbling, the son of the composer Ambros Rieder (1771–1855). He studied at the Academy of Fine Arts Vienna, where he first met and befriended Franz Schubert. Schubert's brother Ferdinand Schubert described Rieder's brother Johann as 'my only true friend' in a letter to Schubert on 3rd July 1824. Rieder's aquarell of Schubert from 1825 was supposedly started when Rieder sheltered from a rainstorm in Schubert's lodgings at the Fruhwirth-Haus (Technikerstrasse 9). Schubert's friends thought it was a very good likeness: Leopold von Sonnleithner called it 'the most like him', whilst Josef von Spaun called it 'an extraordinarily good likeness'.

He subsequently painted a number of Schubert's portraits. Rieder also painted a number of religious and historical themed works. He became professor of drawing at the Institute of Engineering in Vienna in 1825, and in 1855 was appointed to a similar post  at the Military Academy at Wiener Neustadt. From 1857 he was assistant curator of paintings at the Belvedere palace.

References
 Constantin von Wurzbach : Rieder, Wilhelm August . In : Biographical Dictionary of the Empire of Austria. Volume 26, published by LC Zamarski, Vienna 1874, pp. 107–110 .
 Art Auction by CJ Wawra : catalog of the artistic legacy of the history painter Wilhelm August Rieder, Vienna: CJ Wawra, 1881.
 Wilhelm August Rieder. In : Ulrich Thieme, Felix Becker, among others : general lexicon of visual artists from antiquity to the present. Volume XXVIII, E. A. Seemann, Leipzig 1934, p 322
 Prof. August Bangert : The 100th Death of W. A. Rieder, Perchtoldsdorf, 1980.
 G. Wacha : Wilhelm August Rieder . In : Austrian Biographical Encyclopaedia 1815-1950 ( ÖBL) . Volume 9 Austrian Academy of Sciences, Vienna, 1988, page 140
 Otto Erich Deutsch (ed.): Schubert: Memoirs by his friends (translation of the German edition, Breitkopf & Härtel, Leipzig, 1957 by Rosamond Ley and John Nowell), Wiesbaden : Breitkopf & Härtel, 1995,  .
 Otto Erich Deutsch (ed.): Schubert a documentary biography, Dent, London 1946
 Ernst Hilmar : Schubert [Image Biography ] , Graz : Akademische Druck-u Verlagsges, 2 . revised edition, 1996,  .
 Wilhelm August Rieder. In : Peter Clive: Schubert and his World, Oxford 1997. 

1796 births
1880 deaths
Academy of Fine Arts Vienna alumni